A Legislative Assembly election was held on 25 November 2013 in Madhya Pradesh, India, with the result announced on 8 December. Along with four other state assembly elections, these were the first elections in which the Election Commission of India (ECI) implemented a "None of the above" (NOTA) voting option, allowing the electorate to register a neutral vote but not to outright reject candidates. In a first, the Election Commission of India also appointed Central Awareness Observers, whose main task was to oversee voter awareness and facilitation.

Opinion polls
All major pre-poll surveys predicted BJP's win.

List of declared candidates
A total of 2,586 candidates filled their nomination for 230 seats spread across 51 districts.

Prominent BJP candidates included former CM Babulal Gaur (Govindpura constituency in Bhopal), Gopal Bhargava (Rehli in Sagar),  Kailash Vijayvargiya (Mhow in Indore) and former PM, Atal Bihari Vajpayee’s nephew Anoop Mishra (Bhitarvar in Gwalior).

Prominent Congress candidates included former Union Minister Suresh Pachouri (Bhojpur), leader of the opposition in the assembly Ajay Singh (Churhat), Digvijaya Singh’s son Jaivardhan Singh (Raghogarh), and Sachin Yadav, son of former Deputy CM, Subhash Yadav (Kasravad).

* = Puar died of cardiac arrest on 20 June 2015.

Campaign
On 10 November, CM Shivraj Singh Chouhan, who won an election from the Budhni seat in 2008, decided to run again from two seats, Budhni and Vidisha.

A large number of rallies took place prior to elections addressed by various local and national level party leaders including BJP's prime ministerial candidate for forthcoming General Elections, Narendra Modi and Congress vice president, Rahul Gandhi.

BJP leader and Chief Ministerial candidate Shivraj Singh Chouhan used 3D Virtual Live Technology to address various rallies simultaneously from one place. This technology was previously used by the then Gujarat Chief Minister, Narendra Modi during 2012 Gujarat legislative assembly election

BJP extensively campaigned on social media including Twitter and Facebook to attract young and first time voters. BJP's mobile app was also released in a view of upcoming state and General Elections on various platforms including Android, iOS, and Symbian.

ECI also made people aware of the newly introduced NOTA button on EVMs.

Controversies
On 5 November, Madhya Pradesh Legislative Assembly speaker and Jabalpur Cantonment MLA, Ishwar Das Rohani died following a heart attack.

Polls were conducted peacefully and no major untoward incident was reported, however, the Election Commission said minor incidents of violence were reported from Bhind and Morena districts.

An assistant poll official in Katni district’s Vijayraghavgarh seat, KB Shrivastava, died of a heart attack while on duty. A case was registered against state minister Ranjana Baghel in Dhar district for allegedly bribing voters.

Election
Voter-verified paper audit trail (VVPAT) along with EVMs was used in 1 assembly seat in Madhya Pradesh elections. There were over 47 million voters were eligible to exercise their Right to Franchise. Polling for the 230-member assembly began at 0800 hours IST and continued till 1700 hours, baring three Naxal-affected seats of Baihar, Paraswada and Lanjhi in Balaghat district where it ended at 1500 hours.

Polling started with a brisk voter turnout reaching only 18% till 1100 hours, however, turnout increased significantly after mid-day and reached 71% by the evening, surpassing the earlier 69.08% turnout recorded during 2008 elections, making it the highest recorded voter turnout in Madhya Pradesh.

Results
Counting of votes started on December 8, 2013 at 0800 hours IST which continued till later part of the evening. BJP emerged as the winner with 165 seats followed by Congress and BSP with 58 and 4 seats respectively. 3 Independent MLAs also won the polls.

!colspan=10|
|-
! colspan="2" rowspan="2" |Parties and coalitions
! colspan="3" |Popular vote
! colspan="3" |Seats
|-
! Votes !! % !! ±pp!!Contested!! Won !! +/− 
|-style="text-align:right"
| 
| style="text-align:left;" |Bharatiya Janata Party (BJP)||15,191,335 
|44.88||
|230|| 165 ||  
|-style="text-align:right"
| 
| style="text-align:left;" |Indian National Congress (INC)||12,315,253 
|36.38|| 
|229|| 58 || 
|-style="text-align:right"
| 
| style="text-align:left;" |Bahujan Samaj Party (BSP)||2,128,333
|6.29|| 
|227|| 4 || 3  
|-style="text-align:right"
| 
| style="text-align:left;" |Independents (IND)||1,820,251 
|5.38|| 
|1096|| 3 || 
|-style="text-align:right"
| style="text-align:left;" colspan="2" |None of the Above (NOTA)
|643,171 
|1.90
|1.9
| colspan="3" style="background-color:#E9E9E9" |
|-
|- class="unsortable" style="background-color:#E9E9E9"
! colspan="8" |
|-style="text-align:right"
| colspan="2" style="text-align:left; " |Total
|33,852,504
|100.00
| style="background-color:#E9E9E9" |
|2813 
|230
|±
|-
! colspan="8" |
|-style="text-align:right"
| colspan="2" style="text-align:left; " |Valid votes
| 33,852,504 
|99.86
| colspan="5" rowspan="5" style="background-color:#E9E9E9" |
|-style="text-align:right"
| colspan="2" style="text-align:left; " |Invalid votes
|47,451
|0.14
|-style="text-align:right"
| colspan="2" style="text-align:left; " |Votes cast / turnout
|33,900,955
|72.69
|-style="text-align:right"
| colspan="2" style="text-align:left; " |Abstentions
|12,735,833
|27.31
|-style="text-align:right"
| colspan="2" style="text-align:left; " |Registered voters
|46,636,788 
| colspan="1" style="background-color:#E9E9E9" |
|-
! colspan="9" |
|-
| colspan="9" style="text-align:left; " |Source: Election Commission of India
|}

Constituency-wise results 

*Dadu died in a car accident on 9 June 2016 Manju Rajrenda Dadu was subsequently elected to fill the vacancy.

See also
 2013 elections in India

References 

2013 State Assembly elections in India
State Assembly elections in Madhya Pradesh
2010s in Madhya Pradesh